San Vicente de la Barquera is a municipality of Cantabria in northern Spain. It had a population of 4,412 in 2002. Tourism is its main activity due to the area's natural environment and heritage. Approximately 80% of the municipal area belongs to the Oyambre Natural Park and enjoys a special protection regulated by the autonomous community of Cantabria as a result of its landscape and ecological value.

References

Municipalities in Cantabria
Port cities and towns on the Spanish Atlantic coast